Hurricane is a name used by many different fictional characters appearing in American comic books published by Marvel Comics.

The characters are unrelated and include a western gunslinger, superheroes, and supervillains.

Fictional character biography

Harry Kane
Hurricane (Harold "Harry" Kane), created by Stan Lee and Dick Ayers, was an enemy of the Two-Gun Kid. Originally the leader of a bandit gang defeated by The Kid, he gained super speed from drinking an Indian shaman's potion, which enabled him to outdraw many of his opponents in a gun fight (first seen in Two-Gun Kid #70 1964). He fought the Two-Gun Kid several times, but was ultimately defeated each time. Later, the time travelling West Coast Avengers battled Hurricane and the group of outlaws he belonged to; he battled Tigra, but was defeated along with his partner Rattler and taken into custody.

In 1876, Kane was asked by an Indian medicineman, to whom he owned a favor, to escort an Indian woman named Little Cloud to the Apache.

Makkari

The Golden Age character Hurricane was retconned as an identity of the Eternal Makkari.

Albert Potter
Hurricane (Albert Potter) was an enemy of Captain Britain and a former meteorologist. A weather experiment gave him strong weather and energy manipulating powers. He initially clashed with Captain Britain, but was defeated and incarcerated in Darkmoor Prison.

While jailed, Potter agreed to participate in medical experiments. Doctor Samuel Merrick used him as one of the first test subjects for his Gene Match Device (GMD), rewriting Potter's DNA to include genetic material from an army ant. The process was intended to enhance Potter's abilities, but seemingly killed him. Hurricane's body was stolen by the Mys-Tech organisation, who later revived and healed him, intending to use Potter as a catspaw in their conflict with Otomocorp and the S.T.O.R.M. anti-terrorist team known as the Gene Dogs. Hurricane was sent to recover a Gene Scanner device from S.T.O.R.M. headquarters - the device had initially been stolen from Mys-Tech by Otomocorp's Q7 Strike Force, but had then been seized by S.T.O.R.M.'s Gene Dogs. Hurricane easily succeeded in this task (also capturing Doctor Merrick, who had created the Gene Dogs by using a later version of the GMD process he used on Hurricane) but was then betrayed by his new associates - Mys-Tech had booby-trapped the device and always intended that Otomocorp should seize it, so arranged this by leaking Hurricane's location to Otomocorp. Hurricane was then beaten and defeated by the Q7 team. However, Potter escaped and took control of Q7 after realising that the GMD process had not been a complete failure - it had successfully enhanced his energy control powers, and had also granted him "hive mind" abilities patterned on the soldier ant, allowing him to mentally control others. Despite this, he was eventually defeated by the combined forces of the Q7 and Gene Dogs teams.

He subsequently reformed and emigrated to the United States. Jobless, he nearly relapsed into a life of crime, before being convinced to stick to the straight and narrow after encountering the Fantastic Four.

Albert Potter is considered a "potential recruit" for the Initiative program, according to Civil War: Battle Damage Report.

Dark Riders version
Hurricane was a member of the second incarnation of the Dark Riders. He first appeared in Cable #17.

He was a mutant with the power to summon force-ten gale winds, which he normally used to disorient his victims while the other Dark Riders battled hand to hand. During their first mission, the Dark Riders faced off against a few of the X-Men, and Hurricane jumped at the opportunity to face Storm. They battled and Storm eventually defeated him. Later, Storm pushed Hurricane's strong winds away and Gauntlet was ready to kill him for failing twice. Fortunately, Genesis did not want Hurricane dead and he stayed with the Dark Riders.

Hurricane was one of the Riders who broke Cyber out of prison, and the two seemed to have some anger towards each other though they had just met. During the adamantium bonding process on Wolverine, Hurricane was killed when Wolverine rejected the adamantium, exploding the tank and sending shards of adamantium everywhere. Hurricane was impaled by hundreds of adamantium shards and died instantly.

Hurricane, along with several of his fellow Dark Riders, was resurrected by means of the Transmode Virus to serve as part of Selene's army of deceased mutants. Under the control of Selene and Eli Bard, he took part in the assault on the mutant nation of Utopia.

He and the Dark Riders reappear in the "All-New, All-Different Marvel" against Magneto and his Uncanny X-Men. The Riders are killing mutants with healing powers. The manage to kill Elixir, but are ambushed on Genosha. It is assumed they died, since Magneto strapped them to a bomb and leveled the entire island.

Civil War version
A new Hurricane character was introduced in the Civil War: The Initiative one-shot. Not much is known about this character, except that he has an inhuman resistance to damage and an unusual intellect which he used to design his own special "gear", which apparently grants him his powers. It is also mentioned that Hurricane had only been a super-hero for nine months and three days when the story began. As an unregistered superhuman, he was confronted by the Thunderbolts. In turn, the Thunderbolts fought Hurricane, practically crippled him, and apparently exposed Hurricane to the public. What became of him afterwards is unknown.

The character is referred to as "Hurricane II" during the issue. OHOTMU writer Stuart Vandal said on a Comixfan forum that this Hurricane is not the same person as Albert Potter.

Powers and abilities
Albert Potter can perform aerokinesis. He is dependent on his special suit to keep him from losing control of his abilities.

The Dark Raiders version of Hurricane can produce gale-force winds.

Other versions

Marvel Zombies 5
An alternate universe Harry Kane runs a small saloon with the assistance of his daughter Jacali. He is tormented by the loss of his wife Little Cloud in a trick-show; his powers only work against a threat and he had killed her because she bore no ill-will against him. Zombies invade his town. Despite his speed, he dies in battle but not before transferring his powers to his daughter. She continues his legacy of heroism.

Ultimate Marvel
This Hurricane is a character in the Ultimate Marvel Universe, a woman with super-human speed (gained from surgery) from North Korea. She is a member of The Liberators, an international counterpart of the Ultimates. The Liberators invade the USA, killing thousands. She is defeated when Quicksilver forced her to move at speeds beyond her limits, tearing her body apart.

Footnotes

External links
 
 
 

Fictional characters with air or wind abilities
Marvel Comics characters who can move at superhuman speeds
Marvel Comics mutants
Marvel Comics supervillains